Luna is an outdoor bronze sculpture by American sculptor Ellen Tykeson, installed on the University of Oregon campus, in Eugene, Oregon, United States. It was created in 2000.

See also 

 2000 in art

References

External links

 Luna at EllenTykeson.com

2000 sculptures
Bronze sculptures in Oregon
Outdoor sculptures in Eugene, Oregon
Sculptures of women in Oregon
Statues in Eugene, Oregon
University of Oregon campus